The discography of Creeper, an English rock band, consists of two studio albums, six extended plays (EPs), 17 singles, 19 music videos and two other appearances. Formed in Southampton by vocalist Will Gould, guitarists Ian Miles and Sina Nemati, bassist Sean Scott and drummer Dan Bratton, Creeper independently released their self-titled debut EP in June 2014. After signing with Roadrunner Records, the band released their second EP The Callous Heart in September 2015.

After Nemati was replaced by Oliver Burdett and touring keyboardist and vocalist Hannah Greenwood was upgraded to a full-time member, Creeper released The Stranger in February 2016, which reached the top ten of the UK Rock & Metal Albums Chart. The group's debut album Eternity, in Your Arms followed in March 2017, which debuted at number 18 on the UK Albums Chart and topped the UK Rock & Metal Albums Chart. Christmas-themed EP Christmas was issued in December.

After a year-long hiatus, Creeper issued the first single of their second era, "Born Cold", on 3 November 2019. Their second album, Sex, Death & the Infinite Void, followed in July 2020. The album debuted at number 5 on the UK Albums Chart and topped the UK Rock & Metal Albums Chart. A year later in July 2021, the group released a follow-up EP, American Noir, which reached number 13 on the UK Albums Chart and number 1 on the UK Rock & Metal Albums Chart.

Studio albums

Extended plays

Singles

Music videos

Other appearances

References

External links
Creeper official website

Discographies of British artists
Punk rock group discographies